Reddington Hospital is a private hospital in Lagos, Nigeria.

Establishment
Reddington commenced operations as a health care provider in 2001 with the establishment of the Cardiac Centre, in Victoria Island which was affiliated with Cromwell Hospital in London. The Lagos hospital was established in 2006. It has another facility in Ikeja.

Milestone
Reddington pioneered Nigeria's first Digital Cardiac Catherization and Angiography suite, a specialty in heart care.

Services
The hospital provides the following services:
renal dialysis
obstetrics and gynaecology 
paediatrics
surgery (endoscopy and day-care) 
ophthalmology 
ENT (Ear, Nose and Throat) surgery 
radiology 
Gastroenterology  (digestive diseases)
psychiatry

References

External links

Private hospitals in Lagos